This list of car audio manufacturers and brands comprises brand labels and manufacturers of both original equipment manufacturer (OEM) and after-market products generally related to in car entertainment that already have articles within Wikipedia. While components sold by these companies have much in common with other audio applications or may market the same products for non ICE applications, they are noted for marketing their products specifically for ICE use.

This is not intended to be a list of all ICE brands, only those with articles already on Wikipedia for other reasons.

Alpine - Aftermarket car audio and infotainment components; OEM option in FCA vehicles for premium audio
Audison
Bang & Olufsen (exclusively OEM option for Ford vehicles and Audi)
Blaupunkt (also an OEM option for the 2004–2006 Pontiac GTO and 2008–2009 Pontiac G8)
Bowers & Wilkins
Bose
Boss Audio
Boston Acoustics 
Burmester Audiosysteme 
Cadence
Cerwin-Vega Mobile
Clarion
Digital Designs
Directed Electronics (manufacturers tuners for SIRIUS-XM Satellite Radio
Dual
Dynaudio 
Focal-JMLab
Grundig
Harman International Industries (over Harman Kardon, Infinity and OEM option for many automotive manufacturers, JBL also OEM option for many Ford and Toyota vehicles, Lexicon (OEM for Hyundai), and Mark Levinson (exclusive OEM option for Lexus vehicles))
JL Audio
JVC
JBL
Kenwood (also an OEM option for the Hyundai Accent and Hyundai Tiburon vehicles) 
Lear Corporation (supplier of BMW, Audi, JLR, Daimler, Bentley and others)
LG
McIntosh (also an OEM option for the Ford GT and Subaru Outback H6)
Meridian Audio (optional extras on Jaguars and Range Rovers, and standard on McLarens)
Milbert Amplifiers (vacuum tube car audio equipment)
MTX Audio
Monster Cable (manufacturers speaker wiring)
Metra Electronics
Nakamichi (also an OEM option for Lexus vehicles)
Naim (specially for 'Bentley' a British brand)
Orion
Panasonic (a brand of Matsushita Electric Industrial Co.) (manufacturers Fender and ELS sound systems for Volkswagen and Acura vehicles)
Parrot Automotive
Pioneer (also an OEM option for many GM, Ford, Mazda pickup trucks, Toyota/Lexus and Honda vehicles)
Polk Audio
Pyle Audio
Revel 
Sanyo
Sony

References

car audio manufacturers
Car audio manufacturers